Alfie Clark (born 3 September 2000) is an English professional footballer who plays as a midfielder for  club Exeter City.

Career
Clark joined Exeter City from Southern League Division One South side Larkhall Athletic. He made his senior debut for the club on 18 October 2022, after coming on as a 46th-minute substitute for Timothée Dieng in a 4–1 defeat at Forest Green Rovers in the group stages of the EFL Trophy.

Career statistics

References

2000 births
Living people
English footballers
Association football midfielders
Larkhall Athletic F.C. players
Exeter City F.C. players
Southern Football League players